The 2015–16 Luge World Cup was a multi race tournament over a season for luge, organised by the FIL. The season started on 28 November 2015 in Igls, Austria and ended on 21 February 2016 in Winterberg, Germany.

Calendar

Results

Men's singles

Women's singles

Doubles

Team Relay

Standings

Men's singles

|- class="wikitable sortable"  style="background:#f7f8ff; text-align:center; border:gray solid 1px;"
|- style="background:#ccc;"
! style="width:10px;"|Pos.
! style="width:215px;"|Luger
! style="width:45px;"|Points
|-
| 1. ||align="left"| * || 940
|-
| 2. ||align="left"|  || 795
|-
| 3. ||align="left"|  || 700
|-
| 4. ||align="left"|  || 628
|-
| 5. ||align="left"|  || 617
|-
| 6. ||align="left"|  || 590
|-  
| 7. ||align="left"|  || 524
|-
| 8. ||align="left"|  || 481
|-
| 9. ||align="left"|  || 395
|-
| 10. ||align="left"|  || 377
|-

(*Champion 2015)

Men's singles Sprint

|- class="wikitable sortable"  style="background:#f7f8ff; text-align:center; border:gray solid 1px;"
|- style="background:#ccc;"
! style="width:10px;"|Pos.
! style="width:215px;"|Luger
! style="width:55px;"|Agg. time
|-
| 1. ||align="left"|  || 1:31.739
|-
| 2. ||align="left"|  || 1:32.165
|-
| 3. ||align="left"|  || 1:32.532
|-
| 4. ||align="left"|  || 1:32.647
|-
| 5. ||align="left"|  || 1:32.714
|-
| 6. ||align="left"|  || 1:32.723
|-  
| 7. ||align="left"|  || 1:32.790
|-
| 8. ||align="left"|  || 1:33.122

Women's singles

|- class="wikitable sortable"  style="background:#f7f8ff; text-align:center; border:gray solid 1px;"
|- style="background:#ccc;"
! style="width:10px;"|Pos.
! style="width:215px;"|Luger
! style="width:45px;"|Points
|-  
| 1. ||align="left"| * || 895
|-
| 2. ||align="left"|  || 771
|-
| 3. ||align="left"|  || 769
|-
| 4. ||align="left"|  || 747
|-
| 5. ||align="left"|  || 726
|-
| 6. ||align="left"|  || 712
|-
| 7. ||align="left"|  || 583
|-
| 8. ||align="left"|  || 537
|-
| 9. ||align="left"|  || 425
|-
| 10. ||align="left"|  || 391
|-

(*Champion 2015)

Women's singles Sprint

|- class="wikitable sortable"  style="background:#f7f8ff; text-align:center; border:gray solid 1px;"
|- style="background:#ccc;"
! style="width:10px;"|Pos.
! style="width:215px;"|Luger
! style="width:55px;"|Agg. time
|-
| 1. ||align="left"|  || 1:30.016
|-  
| 2. ||align="left"|  || 1:30.061
|-
| 3. ||align="left"|  || 1:30.132
|-
| 4. ||align="left"|  || 1:30.279
|-
| 5. ||align="left"|  || 1:30.344
|-
| 6. ||align="left"|  || 1:30.543
|-
| 7. ||align="left"|  || 1:30.692
|-
| 8. ||align="left"|  || 1:30.727
|-
| 9. ||align="left"|  || 1:30.784
|-
| 10. ||align="left"|  || 1:30.834
|-

Doubles

|- class="wikitable sortable"  style="background:#f7f8ff; text-align:center; border:gray solid 1px;"
|- style="background:#ccc;"
! style="width:10px;"|Pos.
! style="width:215px;"|Luger
! style="width:45px;"|Points
|-
| 1. ||align="left"|  Tobias Wendl   Tobias Arlt || 1037
|-
| 2. ||align="left"|  Toni Eggert   Sascha Benecken* || 962
|-
| 3. ||align="left"|  Peter Penz   Georg Fischler || 785
|-
| 4. ||align="left"|  Christian Oberstolz   Patrick Gruber || 668
|-
| 5. ||align="left"|  Matthew Mortensen   Jayson Terdiman || 532
|-  
| 6. ||align="left"|  Andris Šics   Juris Šics || 530
|-  
| 7. ||align="left"|  Emanuel Rieder   Patrick Rastner || 486
|-
| 8. ||align="left"|  Andrei Bogdanov   Andrei Medvedev || 482
|-
| 9. ||align="left"|  Robin Johannes Geueke   David Gamm || 481
|-
| 10. ||align="left"|  Tristan Walker   Justin Snith || 449
|-

(*champion 2015)

Doubles Sprint

|- class="wikitable sortable"  style="background:#f7f8ff; text-align:center; border:gray solid 1px;"
|- style="background:#ccc;"
! style="width:10px;"|Pos.
! style="width:215px;"|Luger
! style="width:55px;"|Agg. time
|-
| 1. ||align="left"|  Tobias Wendl   Tobias Arlt || 1:35.013
|-
| 2. ||align="left"|  Toni Eggert   Sascha Benecken || 1:35.320
|-
| 3. ||align="left"|  Peter Penz   Georg Fischler || 1:35.378
|-
| 4. ||align="left"|  Christian Oberstolz   Patrick Gruber || 1:35.658
|-
| 5. ||align="left"|  Matthew Mortensen   Jayson Terdiman || 1:35.780
|-
| 6. ||align="left"|  Alexander Denisyev   Vladislav Antonov || 1:36.186
|-
| 7. ||align="left"|  Thomas Steu   Lorenz Koller || 1:36.197
|-
| 8. ||align="left"|  Tristan Walker   Justin Snith || 1:36.222
|-  
| 9. ||align="left"|  Ludwig Rieder   Patrick Rastner || 1:36.325
|-
| 10. ||align="left"|  Robin Johannes Geueke   David Gamm || 1:36.448
|-

Team Relay

|- class="wikitable sortable"  style="background:#f7f8ff; text-align:center; border:gray solid 1px;"
|- style="background:#ccc;"
! style="width:10px;"|Pos.
! style="width:215px;"|Luger
! style="width:45px;"|Points
|-  
| 1. ||align="left"| * || 491
|-
| 2. ||align="left"|  || 385
|-
| 3. ||align="left"|  || 375
|-
| 4. ||align="left"|  || 355
|-
| 5. ||align="left"|  || 325
|-
| 6. ||align="left"|  || 322
|-
| 7. ||align="left"|  || 286
|-
| 8. ||align="left"|  || 227
|-
| 9. ||align="left"|  || 216
|-
| 10. ||align="left"|  || 156
|-

(*champion 2015)

References

2015-16
2015 in luge
2016 in luge